Vaila Marie Barsley (born 15 September 1987) is a Scottish football defender who plays for Swedish Damallsvenskan club IF Brommapojkarna.

Club career
Barsley played college soccer for St. John's Red Storm while attending St. John's University on a five-year accountancy degree. After graduating she began working for Ernst & Young in New York City, but negotiated a leave of absence when Swedish club Eskilstuna United offered her a professional soccer contract in 2013. Barsley's nine goals from defence helped Eskilstuna win promotion to the Damallsvenskan in her first season. In the 2015 Damallsvenskan season, Eskilstuna finished runners-up to FC Rosengård and Barsley was awarded a new two-year contract.

In March 2022 she transferred to Damallsvenskan newcomers IF Brommapojkarna, following nine seasons with Eskilstuna.

International career
Barsley's mother is from Shetland, which qualifies her to play for Scotland. She made her full international debut on 11 April 2017, in a 5–0 defeat against Belgium.

Personal life 
In December 2018 she married her former Eskilstuna team-mate Annica Svensson.

Honours 
Eskilstuna United DFF
Runner-up
 Damallsvenskan: 2015

References

External links 

 
 
 
 Profile at St. John's Red Storm
 Profile at Connect World Football

1987 births
Living people
English women's footballers
English expatriate women's footballers
Peamount United F.C. players
Arsenal W.F.C. players
Eskilstuna United DFF players
Damallsvenskan players
Expatriate women's footballers in Sweden
Vaila Barsley
Women's association football defenders
USL W-League (1995–2015) players
St. John's Red Storm women's soccer players
Expatriate women's soccer players in the United States
English people of Scottish descent
Scottish women's footballers
Scotland women's international footballers
Vaila Barsley
Vaila Barsley
Lesbian sportswomen
LGBT association football players
Scottish LGBT sportspeople
England women's youth international footballers
IF Brommapojkarna (women) players
Scottish expatriate women's footballers
UEFA Women's Euro 2017 players
Long Island Rough Riders (USL W League) players
Expatriate women's association footballers in Ireland